Hellenic College Holy Cross Greek Orthodox School of Theology (HCHC) is an Orthodox Christian liberal arts college and seminary in Brookline, Massachusetts. Its mission is to educate individuals for life and service in the Orthodox Christian community; this includes men preparing for the priesthood of the Greek Orthodox Archdiocese and other Orthodox Christian entities, as well as men and women for leadership roles in the church or within secular society. HCHC includes a graduate school of theology (seminary) for clerical training and education, and several undergraduate and certificate programs in business, education, literature, and other secular professions.

History
The institution was founded in 1937 as Holy Cross Theological School in Pomfret, Connecticut. In 1946, the school was moved to Brookline, Massachusetts.  In 1966, Holy Cross expanded its undergraduate division into a full four-year liberal arts college named Hellenic College, which opened in 1968. Hellenic College Holy Cross is the only fully accredited Orthodox Christian college, seminary, and graduate school of theology in the Western Hemisphere.

Academics
Hellenic College offers programs leading to the Bachelor of Arts degree.

Holy Cross Greek Orthodox School of Theology offers graduate programs of study leading to the degrees of Master of Divinity (M.Div), Master of Theological Studies (M.T.S.), and Master of Theology (Th.M).

Accreditation
Hellenic College has been accredited by the New England Commission of Higher Education and Holy Cross School of Theology has been accredited by the Association of Theological Schools in the United States and Canada since 1974. Holy Cross is also a member of the Boston Theological Interreligious Consortium.

Campus
Hellenic College is located on a  campus in Brookline, Massachusetts just outside Boston on the former Weld estate. It is notable for having been the longtime practice site of the Boston Celtics.

Summer programs
 "Crossroad" is a ten-day, vocational exploration program for Orthodox Christian high school graduates and rising seniors. Two sessions are held on the HCHC campus each summer.
 The "Pappas Patristic Institute" is a seminar based program that focuses on readings in the Early Church Fathers. This program is geared towards undergraduate and graduate students.

Notable people

Notable faculty

Georges Florovsky
John Romanides
Nomikos Michael Vaporis
Maximos Constas
George L. Parsenios

Notable alumni

 Archbishop Nikitas (Lulias) of the Greek Orthodox Archdiocese of Thyateira and Great Britain
 Metropolitan Philip (Saliba) of the Antiochian Orthodox Christian Archdiocese of North America
 Metropolitan Evangelos (Kourounis) of Sardes, titular bishop of the Ecumenical Patriarchate of Constantinople
 Metropolitan Gerasimos (Michaleas) of the Greek Orthodox Metropolis of San Francisco
 Metropolitan Isaiah (Chronopoulos) of the Greek Orthodox Metropolis of Denver 
 Metropolitan Methodios (Tournas) of the Greek Orthodox Metropolis of Boston 
 Metropolitan Nicholas (Pissare) of the Greek Orthodox Metropolis of Detroit
 Metropolitan Savas (Zembillas) of the Greek Orthodox Metropolis of Pittsburgh 
 Bishop Andonios (Paropoulos) of Phasiane, auxiliary bishop and Chancellor of the Greek Orthodox Archdiocese of America
 Bishop Demetrios (Kantzavelos) of Mokissos, auxiliary bishop and Proistamenos of the St. Photios Greek Orthodox National Shrine
 Bishop Dimitrios (Couchell) of Xanthos, titular bishop of the Ecumenical Patriarchate of Constantinople 
 Bishop Kyrillos (Abdelsayed), auxiliary bishop for Christian Education and Dean of St. Athanasius and St. Cyril Theological School in the Coptic Orthodox Diocese of Los Angeles, Southern California, and Hawaii
 Demetrios Constantelos
 Emmanuel Lemelson of Massachusetts of the Greek Orthodox Metropolis of Boston

Interments
Archbishop Iakovos (Koukouzis) of America
Bishop Gerasimos (Papadopoulos) of Abydos
Metropolitan Silas (Koskinas) of New Jersey

References

External links
 

1937 establishments in Massachusetts
Buildings and structures in Brookline, Massachusetts
Eastern Orthodox seminaries
Eastern Orthodox universities and colleges
Eastern Orthodoxy in Massachusetts
Educational institutions established in 1937
Greek Orthodox Archdiocese of America
Greek-American culture in Massachusetts
Seminaries and theological colleges in Massachusetts
Private universities and colleges in Massachusetts
Universities and colleges in Norfolk County, Massachusetts